Briše is a settlement west of Izlake in the Municipality of Zagorje ob Savi in central Slovenia. The area is part of the traditional region of Upper Carniola. It is now included with the rest of the municipality in the Central Sava Statistical Region.

Church

The local church is dedicated to the Holy Name of Mary and belongs to the Parish of Kolovrat. It dates to the 16th century.

References

External links

Briše on Geopedia

Populated places in the Municipality of Zagorje ob Savi